Herbert is a town located in the Rural Municipality of Morse No. 165, in southwest Saskatchewan, Canada. The community is 48 km east of the city of Swift Current, and 197 km west of Regina, the provincial capital, on the Trans-Canada Highway. Its population as of 2016 was 856.

Herbert was named after the British diplomat Sir Michael Henry Herbert. It is the hometown of CBC Sports broadcaster Don Wittman. Herbert was also the home of former senator Jack Wiebe.

Attractions

The Herbert Train Station Museum is the best place to stop for information on the town of Herbert. The train station is located on 625 Railway Avenue. The Klassen Museum (c. 1916) is a Municipal Heritage Property on the Canadian Register of Historic Places.

Education

Herbert School offers kindergarten to grade 12 and is in the Chinook School Division 211

Recreation

Herbert has a skating rink and a curling rink, a swimming pool, a number of ball diamonds, and a gym within the school.
 
Herbert is also home to the Herbert Stampede, a Canadian Cowboys Association approved Rodeo. Herbert Stampede was the CCA's 2008 and 2014 Rodeo of the year. The Herbert Stampede also features the very popular Wild Cow Race and The Wild West Parade.

Amenities

Herbert also has a Highway Inn Restaurant, CO-OP store, a pharmacy, a hospital/nursing home, a senior home, a public library, MCC thrift store, a car wash & a post office.

Demographics 

See also

 List of communities in Saskatchewan
 List of towns in Saskatchewan

References

External links

Towns in Saskatchewan
Morse No. 165, Saskatchewan